Steve Huebert (born April 5, 1959) is a Republican member of the Kansas House of Representatives, representing the 90th district. He has served since 2001. The American Conservative Union has given him a lifetime evaluation of 81%.

Huebert, who earned his BS from Wichita State University, has worked as an ergonomic analyst and systems engineer.  His is married to Marsha and has three children, Sara, Allyson and Jake. From 1993 to 1995 he served on the Unified School District 262 School Board.

Committee membership
 Education
 Federal and State Affairs
 Elections (Chair)
 Local Government
 Joint Committee on Administrative Rules and Regulations
 Joint Committee on Special Claims Against the State

References

External links
 Kansas Legislature - Steve Huebert
 Project Vote Smart profile
 Kansas Votes profile

Republican Party members of the Kansas House of Representatives
Living people
21st-century American politicians
1959 births
Wichita State University alumni